Daniel Blake may refer to:
Boris Starling (born 1969), British novelist, screenwriter and newspaper columnist
I, Daniel Blake, a 2016 drama film by Ken Loach